The Men's 4 × 100 metre medley relay competition of the 2022 European Aquatics Championships was held on 17 August 2022.

Records
Prior to the competition, the existing world, European and championship records were as follows.

The following new records were set during this competition.

Results

Heats
The heats were started at 10:11.

Final
The final was held at 19:25.

References

Men's 4 x 100 metre medley relay